The Bernard SIMB AB 16 was a three engine, five seat utility aircraft designed and built in 1927 for general purpose military work in the French colonies. The Colonial category, which led for example to the Bernard 160, was not properly defined until 1930 and the Bernard 16 was not ordered into production. It was the last Bernard aircraft built by the Société Industrielle des Métaux et du Bois (SIMB); later designs were produced by the Société des Avions Bernard.

Specifications

References

Bibliography

1920s French military utility aircraft
AB016
Trimotors
Biplanes